Stanislav Zhukov (born 26 March 1992) is a Ukrainian handball player for VfL Gummersbach and the Ukrainian national team.

He represented Ukraine at the 2020 European Men's Handball Championship.

References

1992 births
Living people
Ukrainian male handball players
People from Novovolynsk
HC Motor Zaporizhia players
VfL Gummersbach players
Sportspeople from Volyn Oblast
21st-century Ukrainian people